Clairs-Soleils is a small area on Besançon's east side, near the quarters of Bregille and Orchamps. The quarter has about 3000 inhabitants.

History 
Like Planoise, Clairs-Soleils was built in response Besançon's rapid population growth. Since the 1990s, Clairs-Soleils has come to bear the nickname "little Chicago" in reference to its high crime rate.

Buildings and monuments 
 Martin Luther King center
 Library
 Nursery

Church 
 Church of Saint-Paul

Shops 
 Pharmacy
 Bakery
 Office of Tobacco
 Kebab shop

Sport 
 Clairs-Soleils football club

Education 
 Jean Macé kindergarten
 Raymond Vauthier kindergarten
 Jean Macé public primary school
 College of Clairs-Soleils

Transport 
 Only line number 7 serves the area

Famous inhabitants 
 Sofiane Hakkar, a French karate champion

See also 
 Besançon
 Planoise

Notes and references 
 French page about Clairs-Soleils

Clairs Soleils